Theodore Ryland Sizer (June 23, 1932 – October 21, 2009) was a leader of educational reform in the United States, the founder (and eventually President Emeritus) of the Essential school movement and was known for challenging longstanding practices and assumptions about the functioning of American secondary schools. Beginning in the late 1970s, he had worked with hundreds of high schools, studying the development and design of the American educational system, leading to his major work Horace's Compromise in 1984. In the same year, he founded the Coalition of Essential Schools based on the principles espoused in Horace's Compromise.

Life and career
Sizer was born in New Haven, Connecticut, the son of Caroline Wheelright (Foster) and Theodore Sizer, Sr. (1892–1967), an art history professor at Yale University. He received his B.A. in English from Yale in 1953 and subsequently served in the Army as an artillery officer. He later described his experience leading soldiers in a democratic and egalitarian fashion as a formative influence on his ideas about education. After  teaching in high schools, he earned his masters and doctorate in education from Harvard University in 1957 and 1961, respectively.  He was a faculty member and later dean of the Harvard Graduate School of Education, a position he held during the 1969 Harvard student strike. While dean, he reorganized the school into seven departments, expanding the resources available for research (particularly in the area of urban education), while expanding minority enrollment. In 1970, he received a Guggenheim Fellowship  for Education.

Sizer left Harvard to serve as headmaster of Phillips Academy in Andover, Massachusetts from 1972 to 1981, to lead a study of American high schools sponsored by the National Association of Secondary School Principals and the National Association of Independent Schools. From 1983 to 1997, he worked at Brown University as a professor and chair of the education department, and in 1993, he became the Founding Director of the Annenberg Institute for School Reform.

During his years at Brown, he produced most of his books, including Horace's Compromise. In it, he examined the fundamental compromise at the heart of allegedly successful American high schools. He suggested that the students agree to generally behave in exchange for the schools agreeing not to push them too hard or challenge them too severely. Thus, he widened the scope of schools that were failing to do their best to educate children far beyond the traditionally criticized poor and urban schools and challenged the conceptions of what could be considered a successful school. The ideas explored in his Horace Trilogy supply much of the foundation of the Coalition of Essential Schools.

Theodore frequently collaborated with his spouse and fellow educator Nancy Faust Sizer. After Brown University, the couple took a one-year position during the 1998–99 school year as co-principals of the Francis W. Parker Charter Essential School, which Ted helped found and served as a Trustee. Deborah Meier joined the couple in authoring Keeping School, based on the Parker experience. From 1997 through 2006, Sizer returned to the Harvard Graduate School of Education as a visiting professor. He and Nancy co-taught a course on redesigning the American secondary school, while he continued to work on the issues of integrating the multiple services that low socio-economic status families need in poor communities.

Sizer was a member of both the American Academy of Arts and Sciences and the American Philosophical Society.

Theodore and Nancy Faust wed in 1955 and had four children together. He died at age 77 on October 21, 2009 at his home in Harvard, Massachusetts due to colon cancer.

Works
 The Age of the Academies (1964)
 Secondary Schools at the Turn of the Century (1964)
 Places for Learning, Places for Joy (1973)
 Horace's Compromise: The Dilemma of the American High School (1984)
 Horace's School: Redesigning the American High School (1992)
 Horace's Hope: What Works for the American High School (1997)
 The Students Are Watching: Schools and the Moral Contract (1999, co-authored with Nancy Sizer)
 Keeping School: Letters to Families from Principals of Two Small Schools (2003, co-authored with Deborah Meier & Nancy Faust Sizer)
 The Red Pencil: Convictions From Experience in Education (2004)
 The New American High School (2013, posthumously)

References

External links

Theodore R. Sizer Papers, 1939-2009, John Hay Library, Brown University

20th-century American non-fiction writers
Deaths from cancer in Massachusetts
Deaths from colorectal cancer
Harvard Graduate School of Education alumni
Yale University alumni
Brown University faculty
Harvard Graduate School of Education faculty
United States Army officers
1932 births
2009 deaths
Coalition of Essential Schools
Writers from New Haven, Connecticut
People from Harvard, Massachusetts
Schoolteachers from Massachusetts
20th-century American educators
Members of the American Philosophical Society
20th-century American male writers
Military personnel from Massachusetts